Matthijs Siegenbeek (23 June 1774 in Amsterdam – 26 November 1854 in Leiden) was a Dutch academic. From 1797 to 1847 he was the first professor of the Dutch language at the University of Leiden. From 1803 he was the member, then secretary, of the head-office of that university's literary faculty. Initially he was a Mennonite voorganger in Dokkum.

Family 

Siegenbeek married Geertruida Tieboel (1773-1851) in 1799. They had two sons: Daniel Tieboel Siegenbeek and Jan Willem Siegenbeek.

Spelling-Siegenbeek
In 1804 Siegenbeek set out the official spelling of Dutch. This was attacked by the poet Willem Bilderdijk. 
From 1818 he became a member of the Teylers First Society.

Works
 Verhandeling over de Nederduitsche spelling ter bevordering van de eenparigheid in dezelve, 1804
 Woordenboek voor de Nederduitsche spelling, 1805
 Betoog van den rijkdom en de voortreffelijkheid der Nederlandsche taal, en opgave der middelen om de toenemende verbastering van dezelve tegen te gaan, 1810
 Over de middelen ter vorming van een Nationaal Tooneel, 1817
 Beknopte Geschiedenis der Nederlandsche Letterkunde, 1826
 De eer van Wagenaar en die van Jacoba van Beijeren, 1835

Bibliography
Rob Naborn, De Spelling-Siegenbeek (1804), Master's thesis, VU University Amsterdam, 1985.

Jan Noordegraaf, Norm, geest en geschiedenis. Nederlandse taalkunde in de negentiende eeuw. Dordrecht & Cinnaminson: Foris 1985.

References

External links
 leidenuniv.nl
 iisg.nl
 onzetaal.nl

1774 births
1854 deaths
Academic staff of Leiden University
Dutch language
Orthographers
Spelling reform
Writers from Amsterdam
Members of Teylers Eerste Genootschap